Art Farmer Quintet featuring Gigi Gryce (also released as Evening in Casablanca) is an album by trumpeter Art Farmer's Quintet featuring saxophonist Gigi Gryce. It was recorded in 1955 and released on the Prestige label.

Reception 

In his review for Allmusic, Stephen Cook calls the album "a set that qualifies as one of Farmer's best. A must for every jazz collection". The Penguin Guide to Jazz is similarly positive, giving it a maximum four-star rating. It comments on the strengths of Gryce's compositions, mentioning "Evening in Casablanca" and "Satellite" for their "unusual structures" and "Nica's Tempo" for being "constructed more from key centres than from chords, [it] might be his masterpiece".

Track listing 
All compositions by Gigi Gryce except where noted.
 "Forecast" (Duke Jordan) – 4:48
 "Evening in Casablanca" – 5:20
 "Nica's Tempo" – 7:50
 "Satellite" – 4:21
 "Sans Souci" – 6:39
 "Shabozz" – 5:32

Personnel 
Art Farmer – trumpet
Gigi Gryce – alto saxophone
Duke Jordan – piano
Addison Farmer – bass
Philly Joe Jones – drums

References 

Prestige Records albums
Art Farmer albums
Gigi Gryce albums
1955 albums
Albums recorded at Van Gelder Studio
Albums produced by Bob Weinstock